The 1700 class was a class of diesel locomotives built by Clyde Engineering, Eagle Farm for Queensland Railways in 1963.

History
Initially the 1700 class operated branch line services out of Roma before being relegated to shunting duties. Later they were modified for driver only operation receiving a larger windscreen. They were withdrawn in 2000. 1707 (without bogies) is privately owned and stored at the Queensland Pioneer Steam Railway. The cab of 1710 is at the Workshops Rail Museum, converted to a driving simulator.

References

Clyde Engineering locomotives
Co-Co locomotives
Diesel locomotives of Queensland
Queensland Rail locomotives
Railway locomotives introduced in 1963
Diesel-electric locomotives of Australia
3 ft 6 in gauge locomotives of Australia